Malini Nobhadara, Princess of Srisatchanalai (31 July 1885 – 22 December 1924), was the Princess of Siam (later Thailand). She was a member of Siamese Royal Family. She is a daughter of Chulalongkorn, King Rama V of Siam.

She was the second daughter and the third child of King Chulalongkorn (Rama V the Great) of Siam and Princess Saisavali Bhiromya, the Princess Suddhasininat Piyamaharaj Padivarada, daughter of Prince Ladavalya, the Prince Bhumindrabhakdi and Mom Chin Ladavalya na Ayudhya. She was given full name by her father as Malini Nobhadara Sirinibha Bannavadi

She had 3 siblings; an elder brother, an elder sister and a younger sister:
 Prince Yugala Dighambara, the Prince of Lopburi (17 March 1883 – 8 April 1932)
 Princess Nabhachara Chamrassri (5 May 1884 – 31 August 1889)
 Princess Nibha Nobhadol, the Princess of Uthong (4 December 1886 – 29 January 1935)

Princess Malini Nobhadara died on 22 December 1924, at the age of 39. After she died, on 11 January 1926, her half-brother, King Vajiravudh (Rama VI) gave her a royal title as, The Princess of Srisatchanalai, or translated in Thai as Krom Khun Srisatchanalai Surakanya. She was given the rank of Krom Khun, the 4th level of the Krom ranks.

Royal decorations
   Dame of The Ancient and Auspicious Order of the Nine Gems
   Dame of The Most Illustrious Order of the Royal House of Chakri: received 7 February 1896
  Dame Cross of the Most Illustrious Order of Chula Chom Klao (First class): received 11 November 1895
   King Rama V Royal Cypher Medal, First Class
   King Rama VI Royal Cypher Medal, First Class

Ancestry

References
 Royal Command of giving royal title HRH Princess Malini Nobhadara, the Princess of Srisatchanalai
 Death of HRH Princess Malini Nobhadara

1885 births
1924 deaths
19th-century Thai women
19th-century Chakri dynasty
20th-century Thai women
20th-century Chakri dynasty
Thai female Chao Fa
Dames Grand Cross of the Order of Chula Chom Klao
Children of Chulalongkorn
Daughters of kings